Loren R. Graham (born June 29, 1933, in Hymera, Indiana) is an American historian of science, particularly science in Russia.

Career 
He has taught and published at Indiana University, Columbia University, the Massachusetts Institute of Technology, and Harvard University, where he is currently a research associate. He was a participant in one of the first academic exchange programs between the United States and the Soviet Union, studying at Moscow University in 1960-61.

He wrote a popular book on Native American history (A Face in the Rock) and a memoir (Moscow Stories) which describes his youth in the United States and his adventures in Russia. He has also been a strong supporter of human rights and scholarship. He was a member of the board of trustees of the Soros Foundation.

For many years he has been a member of the Governing Council of the Program on Basic Research and Higher Education, which supports the combining of research and teaching in Russian universities and is financially supported by the MacArthur Foundation, the Carnegie Corporation, the Russian Ministry of Science and Education, and local groups in Russia. He is a member of the advisory council of the U.S. Civilian Research & Development Foundation, which supports international scientific collaboration.

For many years he was a member of the board of trustees of the European University at St. Petersburg and still serves on the board of a body raising money for that university. He donated several thousand books from his library to the European University which has established a special collection in his name.

In much of his work in the history of science, Graham has demonstrated the influence of social context on science, even its theoretical structure.  For example, in his Science and Philosophy in the Soviet Union (which was a finalist for a National Book Award) he delineated the influence of Marxism on science in Russia — in some cases, such as the Lysenko Affair, deleterious, but, in other cases, particularly in physics, psychology, and origin of life studies, positive.

In addition to writing on the history of scientific theories, Graham has written much on the organization of science in Russia and the Soviet Union, including a book on the early history of the Soviet Academy of Sciences (The Soviet Academy of Sciences and the Communist Party) and a more recent one on the situation of science in Russia after the collapse of the Soviet Union (Science in the New Russia; co-written with Irina Dezhina).

Education, awards and personal life
Graham earned his B.A. in chemical engineering at Purdue University and his M.A. and doctorate degree in history at Columbia University.

In 1996 he received the George Sarton Medal of the History of Science Society and in 2000 he received the Follo Award of the Michigan Historical Society for his contributions to Michigan history.

Graham is a member of a number of honorary societies, both American and foreign, including the American Philosophical Society, the 
American Academy of Arts and Sciences, and the Russian Academy of Natural Science. His books have been published in English, Italian, German, Russian, Spanish, French, Japanese, Greek, Persian, Korean and Chinese. In 2012, he was awarded a medal by the Russian Academy of Sciences at a ceremony in Moscow for "contributions to the history of science".

Personal life
Graham's wife Patricia Graham is a prominent historian of education and a former dean at Harvard University.

Works

Major books
 Moscow in May 1963: Education and Cybernetics (with Oliver Caldwell), Washington, 1964
 The Soviet Academy of Sciences and the Communist Party, 1927—1932, Princeton University Press, 1967
 Science and Philosophy in the Soviet Union, Alfred Knopf, 1972
 Between Science and Values, Columbia University Press, 1981
 Science in Russia and the Soviet Union: A Short History, Cambridge University Press, 1993
 Functions and Uses of Disciplinary Histories (edited with Wolf Lepenies and Peter Weingart), Reidel, 1983 
 Red Star: The First Bolshevik Utopia, by Alexander Bogdanov (edited with Richard Stites), Indiana University Press, 1984
 Science, Philosophy, and Human Behavior in the Soviet Union, Columbia University Press, 1987
 Science and the Soviet Social Order (edited), Harvard University Press, 1990
 The Ghost of the Executed Engineer, Harvard University Press, 1993
 The Face in the Rock: the Tale of a Grand Island Chippewa, University of California, 1995
 What Have We Learned about Science and Technology from the Russian Experience?, Stanford University Press, 1998
 Moscow Stories, Indiana University Press, 2006
 Grand Island and its Families (with Katherine Geffine Carlson) GIA, 2007
 Science in the New Russia:  Crisis, Aid, Reform (with Irina Dezhina), Indiana University Press, 2008
 Naming Infinity:  A True Story of Religious Mysticism and Mathematical Creativity, with Jean-Michel Kantor Harvard University Press, 2009
 Lonely Ideas:  Can Russia Compete? MIT Press, 2013
  Death at the Lighthouse:  A Grand Island Riddle, Arbutus Press, 2013
 Lysenko's Ghost: Epigenetics and Russia, Harvard University Press, 2016

Articles
 "What the Reappraisal of Soviet Russia's Top Agricultural Mastermind Says About Putin's Russia" (2016)

Sources
Biographical material and professional details for Loren Graham may be found in:
 Loren Graham and Jean-Michel Kantor, 'A Comparison of Two Cultural Approaches to Mathematics', ISIS 97 (2006), pp 56–74. See 'Notes on Contributors' published in the same issue. 
 Loren Graham and Jean-Michel Kantor, 'Russian Religious Mystics and French Rationalists:  Mathematics, 1900—1930', Bulletin of the Georgian National Academy of Sciences, New Series 1 (175), no. 4 (2007), pp. 44–52.
 Massachusetts Institute of Technology bio (with photo)

References

External links
 

21st-century American historians
American male non-fiction writers
American science writers
Columbia Graduate School of Arts and Sciences alumni
Historians of science
Living people
Massachusetts Institute of Technology faculty
1933 births
Writers from Indiana
People from Sullivan County, Indiana
Historians from Indiana
21st-century American male writers
Members of the American Philosophical Society